Leominster was a non-metropolitan district in Hereford and Worcester, England from 1974 to 1998. The council was based in the town of Leominster.

History
The district was created on 1 April 1974 under the Local Government Act 1972, covering the area of six former districts, which were abolished at the same time:
Kington Rural District
Kington Urban District
Leominster Municipal Borough
Leominster and Wigmore Rural District
Tenbury Rural District
Weobley Rural District
The Tenbury district had previously been in Worcestershire, the other five districts had previously been in Herefordshire. The two counties merged at the same time to become Hereford and Worcester, with Leominster being one of nine districts in the new county, and one of only two which straddled the two historic counties (the other being Malvern Hills District).

In 1998, the district of Leominster and the county of Hereford and Worcester were both abolished, with the former Herefordshire parts of Leominster district becoming part of the new unitary authority of Herefordshire, whilst the former Worcestershire parts were transferred to a redefined Malvern Hills District, which remained in a two tier structure with a re-established Worcestershire County Council as its new county council.

Political control
The first elections to Leominster District Council were held in 1973, initially operating as a shadow authority before coming into its powers on 1 April 1974. Political control of the council from 1974 until its abolition in 1998 was held by the following parties:

Council elections
 1973 Leominster District Council election
 1976 Leominster District Council election
 1979 Leominster District Council election (New ward boundaries)
 1980 Leominster District Council election
 1982 Leominster District Council election
 1983 Leominster District Council election
 1984 Leominster District Council election
 1986 Leominster District Council election (District boundary changes took place but the number of seats remained the same)
 1987 Leominster District Council election
 1988 Leominster District Council election (District boundary changes took place but the number of seats remained the same)
 1990 Leominster District Council election
 1991 Leominster District Council election
 1992 Leominster District Council election
 1994 Leominster District Council election
 1995 Leominster District Council election
 1996 Leominster District Council election

References

Former non-metropolitan districts of Hereford and Worcester
 
Leominster
Council elections in Hereford and Worcester
District council elections in England